George Foxcroft (c. 1634−26 February 1715) was the ninth administrator of the colony of Madras in British India for two terms starting from August 1665 to 16 September 1665 and 22 August 1668 to January 1670. During the rule of his predecessor, Sir Edward Winter, he was imprisoned on suspicion of having made utterances against King Charles II. However, when his term came to an end, he took over as the British East India Company's Agent and was the first to be given the title "Governor of Fort St George". The company's letter constituting the Madras Agent and Council "Our Governor and Agent and Consul in Fort St George" and empowering them to execute judgment in all cases, civil and criminal, was occasioned by the difficulty that arose as to the jurisdiction of the Madras officials over capital cases. This difficulty was solved by the new title and "to modern occupants of the gubernatorial chair it is probably unknown that they owe their designation to a Madras murder."

References 

Governors of Madras
British East India Company civil servants
1715 deaths
1630s births